The Supremes were a Motown all-female singing group.

The Supremes or Supremes may also refer to:
The Supremes (1975 album)
The Supremes (2000 album), a box set
"The Supremes", an episode of The West Wing
The Supreme Court of the United States or, collectively, its members
Ruby and the Romantics, formerly the Supremes, a group from Akron, Ohio